Nurmsi is a village in Paide Parish, Järva County in northern-central Estonia.

Nurmsi Airfield (ICAO: EENI) is located near Nurmsi.

References

Villages in Järva County
Governorate of Estonia